The Big Buddha of Thailand, also known as The Great Buddha, The Big Buddha of Thailand, Phra Buddha Maha Nawamin, and Mahaminh Sakayamunee Visejchaicharn, was in November 2018 the tallest statue in Thailand, the second tallest statue in Southeast Asia, and the ninth-tallest in the world.
 
Located in the Wat Muang temple in Ang Thong Province, this statue stands 92 m (300 ft) high, and is 63 m (210 ft) wide. Construction commenced in 1990, and was completed in 2008. It is painted gold and made of concrete. The Buddha is in the seated posture called Maravijaya Attitude.
 
The statue was built following the order of Phra Kru Vibul Arjarakhun, the first abbot of Wat Muang temple, in order to commemorate the King Bhumibol of Thailand. The statue was built using the donated money from faithful Buddhists considering as the act of making merit. The budget spent on the statue was roughly 104,200,000 baht. Not far from the statue is believed to be the Wat Muang temple. The exact origins of the temple are unknown, as the original temple was destroyed in the 17th century during the war with the Burmese - they invaded and looted the former Thai capital of Ayutthaya. The reconstruction of Wat Muang took a long time and was not completed until 1982, and 8 years later work began on the 'Big Buddha', which was completed 18 years later. 
Nearby are more sculptures which depict the gods, the kings of Thailand and the events of the Siamo-Burma War. Also around the Buddha is a park where lotus flowers grow.

Names 
The statue's formal name, Phra Phuttha Mahanawamintra Sakayamunee Sri Visejchaicharn, was given by Phra Khru Vibul Arjarakun, and means "the Lord Buddha of Wiset Chai Chan, Built in Honor of King Bhumibol." The name is a blend of Sanskrit words: Phra Phuttha (Sanskrit ); Mahanawamintra (Bhumibol's royal title, Sanskrit ), Sakayamunee (Sanskrit ), and Visejchaicharn (Sanskrit )
 
The statue is also known as Luangpho Yai (หลวงพ่อใหญ่) or Luangpho To (หลวงพ่อโต); neither terms refer to any specific Buddha statue. The names literally mean Big Buddha, and are used for any colossal Buddha statue.

See also
 Buddhism in Thailand
 Buddhist art
 Laykyun Sekkya
 List of tallest statues
 Other tallest statues in Thailand
 Phra Phuttha Chok at Wat Khao Wong Phrachan, the 2nd-tallest (75 m.)
 Guan Yin at Wat Huay Pla Kang, the 3rd-tallest (69 m.)
 Luangpho Yai, the 4th-tallest (59.2 m.)
 Phuket Big Buddha, the 5th-tallest (45 m.)

References

External links

Images
 

 
Outdoor sculptures in Thailand
Colossal Buddha statues
Concrete Buddha statues
2008 sculptures
Tourist attractions in Thailand
Ang Thong province
Religious buildings and structures completed in 2008
Concrete sculptures
Buddha statues in Thailand
Statues in Thailand
2008 establishments in Thailand